Sara Farooq (born 20 April 1988) is a Pakistani-born American cricketer who plays as a right-arm medium bowler. She played domestic cricket in Pakistan for Pakistan Universities between 2006/07 and 2007/08. She made her Women's Twenty20 International (WT20I) debut for the United States women's cricket team on 17 May 2019, against Canada, in the 2019 ICC Women's Qualifier Americas tournament.

In August 2019, she was named in United States' squad for the 2019 ICC Women's World Twenty20 Qualifier tournament in Scotland. She played in the United States' opening match of the tournament, on 31 August 2019, against Scotland.

In February 2021, she was named in the Women's National Training Group by the USA Cricket Women's National Selectors ahead of the 2021 Women's Cricket World Cup Qualifier and the 2021 ICC Women's T20 World Cup Americas Qualifier tournaments. In September 2021, she was named in the American team for the World Cup Qualifier tournament. In October 2021, she was named in the American team for the 2021 Women's Cricket World Cup Qualifier tournament in Zimbabwe.

References

External links
 
 

1988 births
Living people
Cricketers from Lahore
Pakistani emigrants to the United States
American sportspeople of Pakistani descent
American women cricketers
United States women Twenty20 International cricketers
Pakistan Universities women cricketers
21st-century American women